Trubatsa undulata is a species of sea snail, a marine gastropod mollusk in the family Muricidae, the murex snails or rock snails.

Description
The length of the shell attains 5.5 mm.

Distribution
This marine species occurs off New Caledonia.

References

 Houart, R. (1991). Mollusca Gastropoda: The Typhinae (Muricidae) from the New Caledonian region with description of five new species. in: Crosnier, A. et al. (Ed.) Résultats des Campagnes MUSORSTOM 7. Mémoires du Muséum national d'Histoire naturelle. Série A, Zoologie. 150: 223-235.
 Houart, R, Buge, B. & Zuccon, D. (2021). A taxonomic update of the Typhinae (Gastropoda: Muricidae) with a review of New Caledonia species and the description of new species from New Caledonia, the South China Sea and Western Australia. Journal of Conchology. 44(2): 103–147.

undulata
Gastropods described in 1991